The Amalfi Coast is a stretch of coastline in southern Italy overlooking the Tyrrhenian Sea and the Gulf of Salerno. It is located south of the Sorrentine Peninsula and north of the Cilentan Coast.

Celebrated worldwide for its Mediterranean landscape and natural diversity, the Coast is named after the town of Amalfi, which makes up its main historical and political centre. It is a very popular jet set destination, and has been an attraction to upper-class Europeans since the 18th century, when it was a frequent stopover on their Grand Tours. Attracting international tourists of all classes annually, the Amalfi Coast was listed as a UNESCO World Heritage Site in 1997.

History 

During the 10th–11th centuries, the Duchy of Amalfi existed on the territory of the Amalfi Coast, centered in the town of Amalfi. The Amalfi coast was later controlled by the Principality of Salerno until Amalfi was sacked by the Republic of Pisa in 1137.

Geography 

Like the rest of the region, the Amalfi Coast has a Mediterranean climate, featuring warm summers and mild winters. It is located on the relatively steep southern shore of the Sorrentine Peninsula, leaving little room for rural and agricultural development. Thirteen municipalities are located on the Amalfi Coast, many of them centered on tourism.

Municipalities

Economy 

The Amalfi Coast is known for its production of limoncello liqueur, made from lemon (known as sfusato amalfitano in Italian) grown in terraced gardens along the entire coastline between February and October. Amalfi is also a known maker of a hand-made thick paper called bambagina, symbolic of Italy’s ancient traditional technique for paper production and historically used for private writings, legal acts, and revenue stamps.  Other renowned local products are a particular kind of anchovy (local Italian: alici) from Cetara, and the colorful handmade ceramics from Vietri.

Transport 
Buses and ferries run along the Amalfi Coast, as well as boat excursions from Positano and Amalfi.

Airport 

The Salerno Costa d'Amalfi Airport is the nearest.  However, the most used airport to reach the area from abroad is Naples International Airport (Napoli-Capodichino).

In popular culture 

The natural beauty and picturesque landscapes of the Amalfi Coast have made it one of the most popular destinations of the world's jet set, earning it the nickname of "Divine Coast" (Divina costiera).

The rulers of Amalfi are the central figures in John Webster's Jacobean tragedy The Duchess of Malfi. The Dutch artist M.C. Escher produced a number of artworks of the Amalfi coast, and Spike Milligan describes his time in Amalfi during a period of leave in the fourth part of his war memoirs, Mussolini: His Part in My Downfall.

The Amalfi Coast was used for scenes of Federico Fellini's 1972 film Roma and for the 2017 American superhero film Wonder Woman, where it was depicted as the Amazon island of Themyscira.

The Amalfi Coast serves as a setting for fictional racetracks in the Forza Motorsport 3, Forza Motorsport 4 and Gran Turismo 4. It also plays host to the fictional town of Sapienza in Hitman.

The city of Positano is featured in John Steinbeck's 1953 short story Positano. The city is also featured in Under the Tuscan Sun, Christopher Nolan's Tenet and the Kath and Kim movie Kath & Kimderella.

See also 

 Cilentan Coast, located on the Gulf of Salerno's southern shore

Notes

References

External links 

 
 Amalfi Coast at ENIT – Italian National Tourist Board

 
Coasts of Italy
Landforms of Campania
Landforms of the Tyrrhenian Sea
Tourist attractions in Campania
World Heritage Sites in Italy